The Şehitlik Mosque is a Sunni mosque in Berlin, Germany, operated by Ditib.

Completed in 2005, the mosque building was designed in an Ottoman revival style by Hilmi Şenalp. The four storied building can house 1500 worshipers. The complex also includes a cultural center, and an information and meeting center.

The mosque took its name from the Turkish cemetery, which was laid out as a diplomatic cemetery back in 1866. Among the graves of honor there are those for the Armenian genocide perpetrators Cemal Azmi and Bahattin Şakir, which was criticized by Kurdish-German politician  in 2005.

History 
The foundation stone for the building took place in 1999, and the mosque was completed in 2005. It was designed by Hilmi Şenalp.

The mosque was also the target of four arson attacks in 2010. In 2011, the perpetrator was arrested and sentenced to two years and nine months in prison.

Architecture 

The mosque was modeled on Ottoman architecture from the 16th and 17th centuries. The mosques has two minarets of height 37.1 m, and a main dome of height 21.3 m.

References

Bibliography 

 Rochus Wiedemer: Die Şehitlik-Moschee in Berlin-Neukölln. Neoosmanische Pastiche und bauliches Zeugnis einer lokalen Geschichte des Islam. In: INSITU 2018/2, S. 317–328.

External links 

 Official website

Mosques in Berlin
DITIB mosque